Penaga is a state constituency in Penang, Malaysia, that has been represented in the Penang State Legislative Assembly.

The state constituency was first contested in 1974 and is mandated to return a single Assemblyman to the Penang State Legislative Assembly under the first-past-the-post voting system. , the State Assemblyman for Perai is Mohd Yusni Mat Piah from the Malaysian Islamic Party (PAS).

Definition

Polling districts 
According to the federal gazette issued on 30 March 2018, the Penaga constituency is divided into 9 polling districts.

Demographics

History

Election results

See also 
 Constituencies of Penang

References

Penang state constituencies